Killalpaninna Mission, also known as just Killalpaninna, or alternatively Bethesda Mission, was a Lutheran mission for Aboriginal people in  northeast South Australia, whose site is now located in the locality of Etadunna. It existed from 1866 to 1915.

The mission was founded by two German missionaries, Johann Friedrich Gößling and Ernst Homann, and two lay brethren, Hermann Vogelsang and Ernst Jakob. After a difficult three-month journey from Tanunda, they established their mission station at Lake Killalpaninna (about 40 km south of Cooper's Creek) and tried to convert the Dieri (Diyari) people to Christianity. Anthropologist and linguist Carl Strehlow worked on the mission from 1892 to 1894, before moving to Hermannsburg. Strehlow and Johann Georg Reuther translated Christian works into the Diyari language, and also documented the grammar and vocabulary of the language.

The South Australian Royal Commission on the Aborigines gathered evidence from the mission in 1914, and recommended that the mission be taken over by the government. The mission was closed by the state government in 1915. At that time, there were 70 Aboriginal children living at the mission.

After the mission closed, the station became a cattle station. The school continued to operate until 1917, when the government closed all Lutheran schools. 

The station was listed on the South Australian Heritage Register on 8 November 1984 under the name "Killalpaninna Mission Historic Site".

See also

Other 19th century Aboriginal missions in SA
Koonibba
Point McLeay
Point Pearce
Poonindie

References

Far North (South Australia)
South Australian Heritage Register
Lutheranism in Australia
Australian Aboriginal missions
1915 disestablishments in Australia
Lutheran buildings and structures in Oceania
Mission stations in Australia
1866 establishments in Australia